Josephburg is a hamlet in Alberta, Canada within Strathcona County. It is near Alberta's Industrial Heartland, home to petrochemical industries.

The Warren Thomas (Josephburg) Aerodrome, a local airport serving Strathcona County and Alberta's Industrial Heartland, is located near Josephburg. Josephburg was founded by German immigrants.

Demographics 
The population of Josephburg according to the 2022 municipal census conducted by Strathcona County is 117, a decrease from its 2018 municipal census population count of 118.

See also
List of communities in Alberta
List of designated places in Alberta
List of hamlets in Alberta

References

Hamlets in Alberta
Strathcona County
1890 establishments in the Northwest Territories
Designated places in Alberta